Dr. Greenthumb is a 1998 single by Cypress Hill. The song is about B-Real telling a story about his alter-ego Dr. Greenthumb, a cannabis/marijuana grower. A music video was also released. The name "Dr. Greenthumb" was later used in Tell Me When to Go by E-40. The name Dr. Greenthumb dates back to the 1970s cartoon "Josie and the Pussycats," where the name referred to a villain who ruled "creature plants." It is unclear if this title was lifted by Cypress Hill.

The song begins with a comical skit starring the titular salesman who speaks in an unusually high voice. He introduces the listener to his program where he will demonstrate how to grow the best marijuana whilst also providing canopies called "Sizzlean screens" which prevent the police force from looking down at their marijuana farms from their helicopters. A farmer named Jed is one of his clients and he explains how Dr. Greenthumb saved his life as he was harassed by the cops because of his marijuana farm. Dr. Greenthumb persuades the listener to call him all while smoking some of his own cannabis and hacking and coughing. The actual song begins at 1:15 although it is edited on certain releases which makes the song start at 0:59.

The song's backing rhythm is sampled from the first few seconds of "The Good, The Bad and the Ugly" by The 50 Guitars Of Tommy Garrett, which is repeated throughout the duration of the song.

Track listing

 Dr. Greenthumb-(radio edit) -3:08
 Dr. Greenthumb- (instrumental) - 3:00
 Can you Handle This? - 3:37
 Dr. Greenthumb (Fun Lovin' Criminals Remix) -3:53

1998 singles
Cypress Hill songs
Songs about cannabis
1998 songs
Columbia Records singles
Songs written by DJ Muggs
Songs written by B-Real
Song recordings produced by DJ Muggs